AKB48 is a Japanese idol girl group formed on December 8, 2005. As of 2023, the group consists of 79 members, divided among several teams: Team A with 18 members, Team K with 16 members, Team B with 17 members, Team 4 with 18 members, Team 8 with 29 members which all of them hold a concurrent position with another team., and 10 members of 17th generation trainees

The member lineup often changes for some individual reasons, they "graduate" from the group, and are replaced by members promoted from the trainees. Monica Hesse of The Washington Post describes the AKB48 audition process as "rolling American Idol-esque".

The group has publicized special events for choosing the promotional and recording lineup for some of its singles. To obtain a ballot, voters have to buy the group's latest "election single", or sign up the official paid fanclub. The members who receive the most votes will get to participate in the recording of AKB48's next single, and are heavily promoted. The highest voted member earns the right to be the center performer during the group's live performances.

Mion Mukaichi is the current leader or "general manager" of AKB48 and all of its sister groups. The results from AKB48's annual general elections from 2009–2018 are included. Dark gray cells indicate that the member did not take part in that election. Light gray cells marked "N/A" indicate the member took part in the election, but did not rank. Members who ranked between #81 and #100 are also denoted by light gray cells.

Members are listed by order below as they appear on the official website's roster .

Team A 
Team A is associated with the color pink. The current captain is Mion Mukaichi and they have 18 active members.

Team K 
Team K is associated with the color green. The current captain is Manaka Taguchi and they have 16 active members.

Team B 
Team B is associated with the color blue. The current captain is Nanami Asai and they have 17 active members.

Team 4 
Team 4 is associated with the color yellow. The current captain is Narumi Kuranō and they have 18 active members.

Team 8 
Team 8 was formed in April 2014 and originally included 47 members, each representing one of the 47 prefectures of Japan. Their team color is navy. At the December 2017 team shuffle event, it was announced that the Team 8 members are to hold concurrent positions with one of the other AKB48 Teams A, K, B, and 4. The team was sponsored by Toyota from 2014 to 2021. Members of Team 8 are colloquially referred to as "Eighters." As of December 2022, they have 29 active members.

Trainees 
Currently the group trainees are 17th generation-members who introduced on May 4, 2022.

Membership Timeline

See also 
 List of former members of AKB48

References 

 
AKB48
AKB48
AKB48